Baroness Thomasine Christine Gyllembourg-Ehrensvärd (9 November 17732 July 1856) was a Danish author, born in Copenhagen. Her maiden name was Buntzen.

Life and writing
She married the famous writer Peter Andreas Heiberg when she was 16 years old. She bore him a son in the following year, the poet and critic Johan Ludvig Heiberg. In 1800, her husband was exiled for political activity and she obtained a divorce, marrying in December 1801 the Swedish Baron Carl Fredrik Ehrensvärd, who was himself a political fugitive, as implicated in the murder in 1792 of Swedish king Gustavus III. Her second husband, who presently adopted the name of Gyllembourg (after his mother, who belonged to the Gyllenborg family), died in 1815.

In 1822 she followed her son to Kiel, where he was appointed professor, and in 1825 she returned with him to Copenhagen. In 1827 she first appeared anonymously as an author by publishing the romance Familien Polonius (The Polonius Family) in her son's newspaper Flyvende Post (The Flying Post). In 1828 the same journal contained Den Magiske Nøgle (The Magic Key), which was immediately followed by En Hverdags-Historie (An Everyday Story). The success of this anonymous work was so great that she adopted the name of "The author of An Everyday Story" until the end of her career.

In 1833–1834 she published three volumes of Old and New Novels followed in 1835–1836 by New Stories which also consisted of 3 volumes. In 1837 she published two novels, Montanus den Yngre (Montanus the Younger) and Nisida (Ricida). Een i Alle (One in All) was published in 1840, Nær og Fjern (Near and Far) in 1841, En Brevvexling (A Correspondence) in 1843, Korsveien (The Cross Ways) in 1844 and To Tidsaldre (Two Ages) in 1845.

From 1849 to 1851 the Baroness Gyllembourg-Ehrensvärd was engaged in bringing out a library edition of her collected works in twelve volumes. On 2 July 1856 she died in her son's house at Copenhagen. Throughout her life she had preserved the closest reticence on the subject of her authorship, even with her nearest friends, and it was only after her death that her authorship became known to the public.

Cultural references
Per Olov Enquist's  1981 play Från regnormarnas liv (Rain Snake) describes the relationship between Gyllenbourg and Heilberg. Anne Marie Ejrnæs's 2002 novel Som Svalen (Like the Swallow) is a biographical novel about Thomasine Gyllembourg.

Works

 Familien Polonius (1827)
 En Hverdags-Historie (1828)
 Den magiske Nøgle (1830)
 Kong Hjort (1830)
 Slægtskab og Djævelskab (1830)
 Den lille Karen (1830)
 Sproglæreren (1831) – play
 Magt og List (1831) – play
 Fregatskibet Svanen (1831) – play
 Drøm og Virkelighed (1833)
 Mesalliance (1833)
 De Forlovede (1834) – play
 Findeløn (1834)
 De lyse Nætter (1834)
 Ægtestand (1835)
 En Episode (1835)
 Extremerne (1835)
 Jøden (1836)
 Hvidkappen (1836)
 Montanus den Yngre (1837)
 Nisida (1837)
 Maria (1839)
 Een i Alle (1840)
 Nær og fjern (1841)
 Jens Drabelig (1841)
 En Brevvexling (1843)
 Korsveien (1844)
 Castor og Pollux (1844)
 To Tidsaldre (1845)

Notes

References
 
 
 Howitt, William, 1792–1879

Further reading
 J. L. Heiberg, Peter Andreas Heiberg og Thomasine Gyllembourg (Copenhagen, 1882). .
 L. Kornelius-Hybel, Nogle Bemærkninger om P. A. Heiberg og Fru Gyllembourg (Notes on P. A. Heiberg and miss Gyllembourg) (Copenhagen, 1883). 
 Søren Kierkegaard, Two Ages: A Literary Review, Vol XIV, Princeton series of Kierkegaard's Writings.
 Inge Nørballe: Guldalderdigtere. Portrætter og poesi (Golden Age Poets. Portraits and poetry), Høst, 1999. 
 Birgit Bertung: Gyldne lænker – kvindernes guldalder. Om forholdet mellem mand og kvinde hos 10 guldalderpersonligheder (Golden chains – the golden age of women. On the relationship between man and woman among 10 Golden Age personalities), C.A. Reitzel, 2006. 
 Elisabeth Hude, Thomasine Gyllembourg og Hverdagshistorierne, Rosenkilde og Bagger, 1951. 

1773 births
1856 deaths
19th-century Danish novelists
Danish women novelists
Burials at Holmen Cemetery
19th-century Danish women writers